Aditya Dubey is an Indian environmental activist. He is a recipient of Diana Award in 2021. In August 2020, Dubey filed a petition to Supreme Court of India, requesting the apex court to help farmers with free stubble- removing machines that could result in reduction in stubble burning which is considered a major cause of air pollution in Delhi. He also reached out to Chief Ministers of Delhi, Punjab and Haryana, advocating against the fine or police actions for stubble burning.

The plea was addressed by Supreme Court and a three judge bench formed a committee led by judge Madan B Lokur to monitor the situation. An ordinance ‘Commission For Management Of Air Quality in Delhi & Adjoining Areas, 2020 was eventually promulgated to handle the air pollution problem in Delhi and nearby areas. Dubey was also a part of 'No Car Sunday' initiative in Delhi that promoted to give up use of personal vehicles for a day.

Early life and work 
Aditya was born to Anurag Dubey and Anu Dubey in New Delhi in 2003. His grandfather Dr. Justice J.N. Dubey was a judge and grandmother Late Saroj Dubey was an Indian politician. Aditya passed his senior secondary exams in 2021 from Modern School Barakahamba Road, New Delhi. Having suffered poor health  and problems with lungs because of the air pollution in Delhi-NCR motivated Dubey to work for the environment. He started the Plant a Million trees initiative in 2016. In 2019, Dubey had filed a complaint against Amazon, Flipkart. The complaint was filed with National Green tribunals and was concerned with the excessive use of plastic and card boxes for product deliveries. He later worked against the single-use plastic in collaboration with Central Pollution Control Board.

During Covid Pandemic he launched the Covid Hunger Helpline with his friends which provided food and rations to the underprivileged classes who were suffering due to the lockdown.

Awards and recognition 
Aditya won UK's prestigious Diana Legacy Award in 2021 for starting an initiative that led to the planting of over 1,80,000 trees.

References

External links
 Aditya Dubey on Twitter
 Aditya Dubey on Instagram

Indian environmentalists
Living people
People from Delhi
2003 births